Jordi Mollà is a Spanish actor, artist, writer, and filmmaker. He has been nominated three times for the Goya Award for Best Actor for The Lucky Star (1997), Second Skin (1999), and El cónsul de Sodoma (1999).

Early life and education
Jordi Mollà y Perales was born and raised in Barcelona, Spain. He trained at the Institut del Teatre, and furthered his studies in Italy, Hungary, and England. His mother tongues are Catalan and Spanish, and he is fluent in English, Italian, and French.

Career

Acting
Mollà breakout role was in Bigas Luna's 1992 comedy drama Jamón, jamón, where he played the jilted lover of Penélope Cruz's character. Mollà went on to star in other acclaimed films in his native country, including Stories from the Kronen and La Celestina. The latter earned him his first Goya Award nomination for Best Supporting Actor. His subsequent starring role in The Lucky Star earned him widespread acclaim, earning him a Premios Ondas, a Butaca Award for Best Catalan Actor, and another Goya nomination, this time for Best Actor. He has since been nominated twice more, for Second Skin and El cónsul de Sodoma.

Mollà made his Hollywood debut in the 2001 biographical crime film Blow, where he played a villainous drug trafficker based on Carlos Lehder. Mollà subsequently played a similar character in Michael Bay's 2003 action sequel Bad Boys II, opposite Will Smith and Martin Lawrence. His co-star Gabrielle Union labeled him as "The Tom Cruise of Spain," when praising his performance as drug lord Johnny Tapia. Mollà then starred in The Tulse Luper Suitcases, an ambitious multi-year, multi-media project created by avant-garde director Peter Greenaway. He has subsequently starred in many high-profile feature films, including Elizabeth: The Golden Age, Knight and Day, Che: Part 2, Colombiana, Riddick, In the Heart of the Sea, and The Man Who Killed Don Quixote. He currently stars on the Amazon Prime series Jack Ryan as Venezuelan President Nicolás Reyes.

Directing
Mollà began directing short films in 1994. His debut, Walter Peralta, earned a Goya nomination for Best Documentary Short. He made his feature directorial debut in 2012 with 88.

Art
Mollà is a self-taught painter.

Filmography

Actor

Filmmaking

References

External links

Jordi Mollà Artist Site
Artwork by Jordi Mollà

Year of birth missing (living people)
Living people
Male actors from Barcelona
Spanish male film actors
Spanish film directors
21st-century Spanish male actors
20th-century Spanish male actors